Cold is the debut studio album by American rock band Cold. The album produced two singles: "Go Away" and "Give".

Background
Regarding the album's producer Ross Robinson, vocalist Scooter Ward stated "Ross is, to me, the best metal producer you can get. He just drags the heaviness out of everything, like with Slipknot. It's amazing what he does. When you record with Ross one time, you gotta give it your all. You have to go off like you would onstage."

When they began recording the album in 1997, Cold were known as Grundig. During the recording process, Ward learned that German stereo manufacturer Grundig was trying to sue him and the band for $300,000 over use of its name. Ward reflected "I thought, what are you talking about? We don't have any money. Everybody was throwing names around. Wes, the Limp Bizkit guitarist, said he had a great idea: Cold. It was the perfect name. It fits the music."

The album is copyrighted from 1997, despite being released in mid-1998. It was meant to come out on November 18, 1997, but was pushed back.

Track listing 
All tracks written by Scooter Ward.

Release and reception
AllMusic gave the album four out of five stars stating "Cold's songwriting isn't always great and they're too concerned with adolescent angst and horror ('Everyone Dies,' 'Insane,' 'Serial Killer,' etc.), but the band's sound is fully formed, resulting in a strong debut." Although the album didn't have excellent sales and lacked heavy promotion, it was ranked the eighth-best album of 1998 by Kerrang! magazine.

A music video was shot for "Give" in 1998, featuring cameos by both Davis and Durst.

Personnel
Cold
Scooter Ward – vocals, rhythm guitar, piano, keyboards
Kelly Hayes – lead guitar
Jeremy Marshall – bass
Sam McCandless – drums

Additional musicians
Fred Durst – additional vocals on "Blame" and "Go Away"
Ross Robinson – additional vocals
Chuck Johnson – additional vocals
Krystal Atkins – female vocal on "Strip Her Down"

Production and management
Production and recording: Ross Robinson
Executive producer: Jordan Schur
A&R for Flip: Fred Durst
A&R for A&M: Larry Weintraub
Mixed by Terry Date: All tracks except "Ugly" and "Strip Her Down"
Mixed by Ross Robinson: "Ugly" and "Strip Her Down"
Engineered by: Richard Kaplan
Assisted by: Chuck Johnson and Rob Agnello
Mastered by: Howie Weinberg

References

Cold (band) albums
1998 debut albums
A&M Records albums
Albums produced by Ross Robinson
Flip Records (1994) albums